Events from the year 1589 in Sweden

Incumbents
 Monarch – John III

Events

 - The King meets his son, Sigismund III Vasa, in Reval in Swedish Estonia and try to convince him to abdicate his Polish throne and return to Sweden. The Royal Council prevents this with the support of the King's brother Duke Charles, which causes a conflict between the King and his brother and council.

Births

 17 April - John, Duke of Östergötland, prince  (died 1618)

Deaths

 27 June - Maria of the Palatinate-Simmern, princess  (1561)

References

 
Years of the 16th century in Sweden
Sweden